1726 Hoffmeister, provisional designation , is a carbonaceous asteroid and namesake of the Hoffmeister family from the central region of the asteroid belt, approximately 23 kilometers in diameter.

It was discovered on 24 July 1933, by German astronomer Karl Reinmuth at Heidelberg Observatory in southwest Germany, and named after astronomer Cuno Hoffmeister.

Orbit and classification 

Hoffmeister is the namesake and lowest-numbered member of the very compact Hoffmeister family, which, based upon its low albedo, was most likely formed from the breakup of a 50–100 kilometer-sized, carbon-rich parent body within the past several hundred million years.

It orbits the Sun in the central main-belt at a distance of 2.7–2.9 AU once every 4 years and 8 months (1,700 days; semi-major axis of 2.79 AU). Its orbit has an eccentricity of 0.04 and an inclination of 3° with respect to the ecliptic.

Physical characteristics 

In the SMASS classification, Hoffmeister is characterized as a Cb-type, a subtype of the carbonaceous C-complex.

Diameter and albedo 

According to the surveys carried out by the Japanese Akari satellite and NASA's Wide-field Infrared Survey Explorer with its subsequent NEOWISE mission, Hoffmeister measures between 22.03 and 25.67 kilometers in diameter, and its surface has a low albedo between 0.03 and 0.05. The Collaborative Asteroid Lightcurve Link assumes a standard albedo for carbonaceous asteroids of 0.057 and calculates a diameter of 17.4 kilometers with an absolute magnitude of 12.53.

Rotational lightcurve 

In December 2009, a rotational lightcurve of Hoffmeister was obtained from photometric observations by astronomers at the Palomar Transient Factory in California. It gave a rotation period of  hours with a brightness variation of 0.40 magnitude.

Naming 

This minor planet was named in memory of German astronomer Cuno Hoffmeister (1892–1968), who founded the Sonneberg Observatory in 1925, and became one of its directors (see 1039 Sonneberga). Hoffmeister discovered thousands of variable stars, co-discovered comet C/1959 O1, thoroughly investigated a large number of meteors, and discovered 5 minor planets: 2183 Neufang, 3203 Huth, 3674 Erbisbühl, 4183 Cuno (which was later named after him) and 4724 Brocken. The lunar crater Hoffmeister was also named in his honor. The official  was published by the Minor Planet Center on 20 February 1976.

References

External links 
 List of 1819 members of the Hoffmeister family, D. Nesvorny, M. Broz, V. Carruba (2015), data
 Asteroid Lightcurve Database (LCDB), query form (info )
 Dictionary of Minor Planet Names, Google books
 Asteroids and comets rotation curves, CdR – Observatoire de Genève, Raoul Behrend
 Discovery Circumstances: Numbered Minor Planets (1)-(5000) – Minor Planet Center
 
 

001726
Discoveries by Karl Wilhelm Reinmuth
Named minor planets
001726
19330724